François Vallé (1716–1783) son of Charles Vallée and Geneviève Marcou, was a French Canadian who immigrated to Upper Louisiana of Beauport, Quebec City sometime in the early 1740s.  Beginning as a laborer of no means, he engaged in agriculture, lead mining, and trade with Indians. Upon his death, he was the wealthiest man in Upper Louisiana.
Vallé also aided greatly in the battle of St. Louis, during the American Revolutionary War, because he gave the defenders of both forts a major tactical advantage by supplying them with genuine lead (instead of pebbles or stones) from his mines for musket balls and cannon balls. He was successively officer of the local French militia then Spanish lieutenant of the militia of Upper Louisiana.

References 

1716 births
1783 deaths
People from Quebec City
People of New France
Commandants and Lieutenants of the Illinois Country
People of Colonial Spanish Louisiana